Kandy Floss is an Indian talk show created and produced by Ekta Kapoor and Shobha Kapoor under their banner Balaji Telefilms. The series premiered on 10 March 2006 on Sony Entertainment Television. The series is hosted by Archana Puran Singh.

Plot
The series is a talk show where chats revolving television celebrities, their life styles, behind the scenes and their unknown secrets are discussed about.

Cast

Host 
 Archana Puran Singh

Guests 
 Urvashi Dholakia
 Shweta Tiwari
 Iqbal Khan & Amit Tandon
 Yash Tonk

References

External links 
 Official Website

Balaji Telefilms television series
Sony Entertainment Television original programming
2006 Indian television series debuts
2006 Indian television series endings
Television shows set in Mumbai
Indian television talk shows